The Appennino Lucano - Val d'Agri - Lagonegrese National Park is an Italian national park located in the province of Potenza of Basilicata region.

It was established in 2007 and its extension is close to 70,000 hectares.

Fauna include wolf, boar and otter along the Agri River.

References

External links
 

Appennino Lucano-Val d'Agri-Lagonegrese
Parks in Basilicata
Protected areas established in 2007
Protected areas of the Apennines